Otago Polytechnic was a public New Zealand tertiary education institute, centred in Dunedin with additional campuses in Cromwell and Auckland. Otago Polytechnic provided career-focused education and training, offering a range of New Zealand accredited postgraduate qualifications, degrees, diplomas and certificates at levels 2–10. In November 2022, it was formally merged into the new national mega polytechnic Te Pūkenga (the New Zealand Institute of Skills and Technology), ending its existence as an independent entity.

History
Otago Polytechnic traces its ancestry back to the Dunedin Technical School, which was established in 1889 to provide evening classes for working people. In 1909 it expanded to offer day classes for secondary school pupils. In 1914 the name was changed to the King Edward Technical College.

In 1921 the college took over the Dunedin School of Art, which was New Zealand's first art school established in 1870. The college expanded further by taking on the evening and day time education of apprentices, technicians and professionals. In 1966 the college was split into a secondary school (later renamed Logan Park High School) and Otago Polytechnic, which opened on 1 February 1966.

On 1 April 2020, the Minister of Education Chris Hipkins confirmed that Otago Polytechnic would be merged into New Zealand Institute of Skills & Technology (Te Pūkenga) alongside the 15 other Institutes of Technology and Polytechnics (ITPs).

On 1 November 2022, Otago Polytechnic formally merged into Te Pūkenga, ending its existence as an independent entity. All its roles and structures were assumed by the new mega polytechnic.

Locations
Otago Polytechnic is spread over a large geographical area with campuses in Dunedin and Central Otago, as well as a campus for international students in Auckland. The Polytechnic also carries out distance-based learning in areas ranging from Veterinary Nursing to Midwifery, work-based learning for mature students through Capable NZ and an online micro-credentialing service called EduBits.

Dunedin campuses

The Dunedin campus is situated on Forth Street, Union Street, Riego Street and Anzac Avenue in Dunedin North, and Cumberland Street in central Dunedin.

The Forth Street campus buildings are situated between University of Otago campus and the Forsyth Barr Stadium, close to the edge of Logan Park. The Schools of Architecture, Building and Engineering and Natural Sciences are located on the old Rehabilitation League site on Anzac Avenue, and the Dunedin School of Art is located on Riego Street. Otago Polytechnic's library is the Robertson Library on Union Street, which it shares with the University of Otago College of Education.

In 2009, Otago Polytechnic vacated buildings in Tennyson Street, close to Stuart Street in the central city. These buildings had previously housed the School of Hospitality, Languages and Fashion, and are owned by the Ministry of Education.

In 2014, a $12 million redevelopment of Otago Polytechnic's F and H Blocks began to transform the space into a contemporary learning environment and Hub. Mason and Wales were the architects for this project.

In 2016, Aoraki Polytechnic merged with Christchurch Polytechnic Institute of Technology to form Ara Institute of Canterbury, and Otago Polytechnic took over the teaching of Aoraki's Dunedin-based programmes. These included beauty therapy, hairdressing, early childhood education, journalism, photography, and film and television.

Technique training restaurant is located on Harbour Terrace and is an initiative established by Otago Polytechnic's School of Hospitality and its Food Design Institute, training future chefs, hotel managers and restaurant staff under the guidance of industry professionals. The restaurant uses produce from local suppliers and Otago Polytechnic's Living Campus gardens. The restaurant offers lunchtime and evening dining to members of the public and hosts a wide range of themed events throughout the year, including midwinter Christmas dining.

There is also a Community Learning Centre in Mosgiel which delivers computer training to the public, as well as holding short computing courses.

Central Otago campus
Otago Polytechnic's Central Otago campus is located in Cromwell on the corner of Molyneux Ave and Erris St, with additional facilities at Bannockburn Road. Plans are underway to consolidate these sites at the Bannockburn Road block. Programmes on offer include long and short courses in Cookery, Business, and Horticulture. Qualifications in Ski and Snowboard Instruction and Avalanche Safety are delivered from Cardrona Alpine Resort and Mount Aspiring College. Otago Polytechnic's Central campus launched a qualification in high country farming in 2014, which is the only one of its kind in New Zealand.  There are two Community Learning Centres which hold computing courses as well as being able to provide career guidance and study assistance for Otago Polytechnic students – these are on the Central Otago Campus and in Queenstown.  In 2009, the two Community Learning Centres in Wanaka and Alexandra were closed.

Auckland International campus
The Auckland International Campus caters to international students and offers professional qualifications in Business and Management, Information Technology as well as National Diplomas in Construction Management and Quantity Surveying. Classes are taught in English. The Auckland International Campus is located on Queen Street in downtown Auckland.

Student accommodation 
In 2018, Otago Polytechnic officially opened its new 231-bed student accommodation complex, Te Pā Tauira - Otago Polytechnic Student Village, at its Dunedin campus. It features dorm rooms, studios and apartments. The $22 million building, designed by Mason & Wales architects, is the largest timber-framed construction in New Zealand at 6000 square metres. The sustainable, cross-laminated timber structure won two awards at the Property Council New Zealand Rider Levett Bucknall Property Industry Awards 2018: Award of Excellence for Green Building and an Award of Merit for Multi-Unit Residential Property.

At its Central Otago campus in the same year, the Polytechnic opened its $3 million, 25-bed student housing complex of fully self-contained units.

International students
Otago Polytechnic offers education and training to both New Zealand and international students. In 2017, Otago Polytechnic had 1252 equivalent full-time international students.

Otago Polytechnic's English Language Centre offers academic and general English courses, aimed at international students, or migrants to Dunedin. Otago Polytechnic's Central Otago and Auckland International campuses also offer English Language courses.

Research and postgraduate 
Its EPICentre is a multidisciplinary workshop studio, available to staff and students as a research facility.

Student exchange programmes and international partnerships 
Otago Polytechnic offers a range of student exchange programmes, available to Otago Polytechnic and international students through its Study Abroad and Explore More initiatives.

International programmes include English language teaching internships, summer school scholarship programmes, winter school scholarship programmes, and partnerships with tertiary institutions in North America, South America, Europe and Asia. Otago Polytechnic also runs an education scholarship programme with its sister-city, Shanghai.

Staff at Otago Polytechnic
Otago Polytechnic has a workforce totalling 543 permanent staff as at the end of 2017. Its pay equity gap in 2017 sat at 4.8 per cent, considerably lower than the national average of 11 per cent. All Otago Polytechnic staff are required to undergo up to date training on New Zealand's Treaty of Waitangi.

Sustainability
Otago Polytechnic has a sustainable campus. During the past three years, Otago Polytechnic has steadily increased the amount of cardboard, glass and plastic they recycle. Otago Polytechnic now recycles the following materials: paper; cardboard; glass; aluminium and steel cans; plastic types 1, 2, 3, 4, 5 and 6; cooking oil and organic waste. The Polytechnic has also managed to reduce its amount of general waste by over two-hundred cubic metres.
 
Since 2012, Otago Polytechnic has implemented some significant changes to reduce its ecological footprint, including creating an internal offset scheme for staff air travel. Otago Polytechnic also recently replaced coal-fired boilers with local woodchip boilers. As well as utilising a renewable energy resource, the potash will be used on the Living Campus gardens.

The Living Campus project is the first of its kind in Australasia and involves turning Otago Polytechnic's existing Dunedin campus into an open-air and interactive museum, a vibrant community garden and a sustainable model of urban agriculture.

In 2015 Otago Polytechnic became the first polytechnic in New Zealand to achieve fair trade status. The institution has been awarded the Fair Trade status in recognition of its commitment to sell only Fair Trade products such as tea, coffee, sugar and chocolate drinks in its cafes and other commercial outlets, and sourcing Fair Trade materials for its schools where appropriate. This is in line with the city of Dunedin's stance towards Fair Trade practice. Dunedin was formally recognised by the Fair Trade Association as New Zealand's first Free Trade city in 2009.

Partnership with Kāi Tahu 
In 2004, Otago Polytechnic signed a Memorandum of Understanding (MoU) with the four Araiteuru Papatipu Rūnaka, or local Māori councils: Te Rūnanga ō Moeraki, Kāti Huirapa Rūnaka ki Puketeraki, Te Runangaō  Ōtākou, and Hokonui Rūnanga. It was reviewed, revised and re-signed by all parties in 2013. The Memorandum guides the Polytechnic's goals and activities, underpinning its Māori Strategic Framework. The MoU's principal objectives are to support and contribute to the achievement of Māori development aspirations, and work together to identify specific educational needs of Kāi Tahu.

The Charity House Project 
Otago Polytechnic's Charity House project is a yearly initiative involving the Polytechnic's architecture, building and engineering students. It has been running since 2007, and has raised in excess of $1 million for charity, with the help of over 20 local businesses that donate time, materials and craftsmanship. At the end of the year, the house is auctioned off. The proceeds go to United Way NZ, a non-profit organisation which distributes the funds to Otago charities.

Student services
Otago Polytechnic offers a range of student services, both itself and in conjunction with University of Otago and Otago Polytechnic Students' Association. These include internal services such as a Childcare Centre, Student Learning Centre, Student Health Centre, Student IT Services and Te Punaka Ōwheo, its dedicated Māori centre. In partnership with Otago University, Polytechnic students have access to UNIPOL Recreation Centre and the Robertson Library.

All enrolled Otago Polytechnic students may consider themselves members of the Otago Polytechnic Students' Association, an independent organisation run by the students and offers support, social events and clubs, access to facilities and services, and the free student magazine, Gyro.

Students' association
The Otago Polytechnic Students' Association provides access to many facilities and services like the student ID card, Clubs & Societies centre, a second-hand bookshop, UNIPOL Sports Centre, a free student newspaper (Gyro), free pool tables, free campus telephones, the Student Discount Directory, social events, and Student Job Search.

The students' association also provides support services like advocacy, campaigns, representation, financial assistance and advice. OPSA is often involved with local authorities representing a student view, especially in transportation and housing issues.

The students' association also advocates everyone's right to tertiary education, and that user-pays education creates a significant barrier to this right. It seeks a return to free tertiary education as it was before 1989.

In 2008 and 2009 the Otago Polytechnic Students' Association took the unusual move of expelling its members involved in illegal violence at the Undie 500. In 2009 the students' association campaigned against the government's removal of student representation from polytechnic councils.

References

 
Educational institutions established in 1966
Education in Dunedin
1966 establishments in New Zealand
Organisations based in Dunedin
1870s in Dunedin
1960s in Dunedin
2022 disestablishments in New Zealand